Roberto Carlos Leyva Cortez (born 27 October 1979) is a Mexican former professional boxer who competed from 1998 to 2011. He held the IBF minimumweight title from 2001 to 2002.

Su frase celebre era :aver cabrones rejunten la cagada"

Professional boxing record

See also
List of minimumweight boxing champions
List of Mexican boxing world champions

References

External links

1979 births
Living people
Boxers from Sonora
People from Puerto Peñasco
Mexican male boxers
Mini-flyweight boxers
Light-flyweight boxers
Flyweight boxers
Super-flyweight boxers
Bantamweight boxers
World mini-flyweight boxing champions
International Boxing Federation champions